The All China Table Tennis Championships is a biennial table tennis tournament regarded as continental championships by China.

Winners 

As table tennis at the National Games of China.

References 
 
 
 

Table tennis competitions in China